The year 1820 in architecture involved some significant events.

Events
 Approximate date – Gatcombe Park, Gloucestershire, England, is remodelled by George Basevi (a relative of the owner at this time, economist David Ricardo).

Buildings and structures

Buildings completed

 Charlotte Square, completing the construction of New Town, Edinburgh, Scotland; laid out to the design of Robert Adam (died 1792).
 Bakers Island Light, Salem, Massachusetts, USA.
 Citadelle Laferrière in Haiti, the largest fortification in the Americas.
 Clock tower of Cathedral of St. Mary the Crowned, Gibraltar.
 Eastnor Castle, Herefordshire, England, by Robert Smirke.
 Inveraray Jail and Courthouse, Scotland, by James Gillespie Graham.
 Óbuda Synagogue, Hungary.
 Pont de la Tosca, Andorra.
 'Stack A' bonded warehouse, Custom House Docks, Dublin, Ireland, by John Rennie the Elder.

Awards
 Grand Prix de Rome, architecture: François Villain

Births
 April 21 – Peter Kerr, architect (died 1912)
 date unknown – George Devey, artist and architect (died 1886)

Deaths
 March 7 – Thomas Baldwin, English surveyor and architect in Bath  (born c.1750)
 May 17 – Vincenzo Brenna, Italian architect and painter (born 1747)
 September 3 – Benjamin Latrobe, Neoclassical architect known for the Capitol building (born 1764)
 October 4 – Thomas Hope, architect and house joiner (born 1757)

References

Architecture
Years in architecture
19th-century architecture